Laurence William Ovens (born 6 September 1985) is an English rugby union player who plays as a prop for Avonvale.

Career
After five seasons with Bath Rugby (2004–2009), he signed for Newcastle Falcons.

In July 2010, Ovens signed for the Bedford Blues, giving him an opportunity to play every week for a promising championship side. He left the club ahead of the 2011/12 campaign.

For the 2011/12 season, Ovens joined Rosslyn Park. He spent three seasons there, leaving ahead of the 2014/15 season.

Personal life
Ovens is married with three children. His first cousin is Josh Ovens.

References

1985 births
Living people
Bath Rugby players
Bedford Blues players
English rugby union players
Newcastle Falcons players
Rosslyn Park F.C. players
Rugby union players from Bath, Somerset
Rugby union props